Marcel Huber (born 25 June 1927) was a Swiss racing cyclist. He rode in the 1951 Tour de France.

References

1927 births
Possibly living people
Swiss male cyclists